Balance is an album by American guitarist Leo Kottke, released in 1978.

It was re-issued on CD by BGO Records (263) in 1996.

On this album, only Whine and Dolores are Kottke's familiar acoustic guitar solos. 1/2-Acre of Garlic is a unique blend of acoustic guitar wizardry and Kottke's vocal, with electric guitar and bass supporting. Learning the Game is a straight ballad rendition of the Buddy Holly classic. The remaining tracks are essentially rock songs. Even Embryonic Journey is given more of a rock band style of treatment than in Jefferson Airplane's original version.

Track listing
All songs by Leo Kottke except as noted.

Side one
 "Tell Mary" – 2:59
 "I Don't Know Why" – 2:30
 "Embryonic Journey" (Jorma Kaukonen) – 3:15
 "Disguise – 3:09
 "Whine" – 3:28

Side two
 "Losing Everything" – 2:32
 "Drowning" – 3:16
 "Dolores" – 4:09
 "1/2-Acre of Garlic" – 2:43
 "Learning the Game" (Buddy Holly) – 4:06

Personnel
Leo Kottke – Acoustic Guitar, Vocals
Kenneth Buttrey – Drums, Clavinet (on “Disguise”)
Mike Leech – Bass
Bobby Ogdin – Piano
John Harris – Piano
Production notes: 
Produced by Kenneth Buttrey
Engineered and remixed by Marty Lewis
Recorded at Quadrafonic Sound Studios,mixed at Westlake Audio,mastered at Mastering Lab by Mike Reese
Assistant Engineers: Jimmy Fitzpatrick, Connie Potter, Paul Ray
Art Direction: John Van Hamersveld
Photography: Larry Williams

References

External links
 Leo Kottke's official site
 Unofficial Leo Kottke web site (fan site)

1979 albums
Leo Kottke albums
Chrysalis Records albums